Siah Chal (also Romanized as Sīāh Chāl; also known as Ershād Maḩalleh and Siakhchal) is a village in Asalem Rural District, Asalem District, Talesh County, Gilan Province, Iran. At the 2006 census, its population was 528, in 136 families.

References 

Populated places in Talesh County